Collis P. Huntington Park is a  park in the Nob Hill neighborhood of San Francisco, California.

Location
Huntington Park is at 1050 Taylor Street and is bordered by California, Taylor, Sacramento, and Cushman streets, in the Nob Hill neighborhood of San Francisco, California.

History
The park is on land donated to the city in 1915 by Arabella Huntington, widow of railroad tycoon Collis P. Huntington. Their house had stood on the site until it was destroyed in the 1906 earthquake and fire. Some of those made homeless by that catastrophe were for a time housed in tents on the site.

Facilities
The city-block-size park contains landscaped areas, a playground, and two fountains.

At one time, dogs were forbidden, so dog owners would walk them at night.

Gallery

See also
 Top of the Mark

References

Nob Hill, San Francisco
Parks in San Francisco
Municipal parks in California
Urban public parks